In mathematics, homological stability is any of a number of theorems asserting that the group homology of a series of groups  is stable, i.e.,

is independent of n when n is large enough (depending on i). The smallest n such that the maps  is an isomorphism is referred to as the stable range.
The concept of homological stability was pioneered by Daniel Quillen whose proof technique has been adapted in various situations.

Examples
Examples of such groups include the following:

Applications
In some cases, the homology of the group

can be computed by other means or is related to other data. For example, the Barratt–Priddy theorem relates the homology of the infinite symmetric group agrees with mapping spaces of spheres.

References

Algebraic topology
Algebraic K-theory